The salivary ducts (a duct of a salivary gland). These include:

 Stensen's duct
 Wharton's duct
 Major sublingual duct